The 1939 Macclesfield by-election was held on 22 November 1939. The by-election was held due to the resignation of the incumbent Conservative MP, John Remer. The only candidate nominated was W. Garfield Weston, also representing the Conservative Party, who was elected unopposed.

References

1939 elections in the United Kingdom
1939 in England
20th century in Cheshire
Macclesfield
By-elections to the Parliament of the United Kingdom in Cheshire constituencies
Unopposed by-elections to the Parliament of the United Kingdom (need citation)